The Pontic Mountains or Pontic Alps (Turkish: Kuzey Anadolu Dağları, meaning North Anatolian Mountains) form a mountain range in northern Anatolia, Turkey. They are also known as the Parhar Mountains in the local Turkish and Pontic Greek languages. The term Parhar originates from a Hittite word meaning "high" or "summit". In ancient Greek, the mountains were called the Paryadres or Parihedri Mountains.

Geography

The range runs roughly east–west, parallel and close to the southern coast of the Black Sea. It extends northeast into Georgia, and west into the Sea of Marmara, with the northwestern spur of the Küre Mountains (and their western extension the Akçakoca Mountains) and the Bolu Mountains, following the coast. The North Anatolian Fault and the Northeast Anatolian Fault, which are east–west-running strike-slip faults, run along the length of the range.

Ecology

The mountains are generally covered by dense forests, predominantly of conifers.

The Northern Anatolian conifer and deciduous forests is an ecoregion which covers most of the range, while the Caucasus mixed forests extend across the far-eastern end of the range, known as the Kaçkar Mountains. The narrow coastal strip between the mountains and the Black Sea, known as Pontus, is home to the Euxine-Colchic deciduous forests, which contain some of the world's few temperate rainforests.

The region is home to Eurasian wildlife such as the Eurasian sparrowhawk, golden eagle, eastern imperial eagle, lesser spotted eagle, Caucasian black grouse, red-fronted serin, and wallcreeper.

Winter conditions are very harsh, and snow even in summer months isn't unusual above certain elevations.

The Anatolian Plateau, which lies south of the range, has a considerably drier and more continental climate than the humid and mild coast, owing to the mountains' rain shadow effect.

References

Mountain ranges of Turkey
Physiographic provinces
Black Sea Region
Landforms of Rize Province
Important Bird Areas of Turkey